Listia is an online marketplace.

Listia may also refer to:
Listia (nematode), a genus of roundworms in the family Leptolaimidae
Listia (plant), a genus of plants in the family Fabaceae

Genus disambiguation pages